The Seafarer is a 2006 play by Irish playwright Conor McPherson. It is set on Christmas Eve in Baldoyle, a coastal suburb north of Dublin city. The play centers on James "Sharky" Harkin, an alcoholic who has recently returned to live with his blind, aging brother, Richard Harkin. As Sharky attempts to stay off the bottle during the holidays, he contends with the hard-drinking, irascible Richard and his own haunted conscience. It was nominated for multiple Tony Awards as well as the Olivier Award and Evening Standard Award for Best Play.

The name of the play links it to the Anglo-Saxon poem The Seafarer.<ref>Brantley, Ben. "Review. A Devil of a Christmas" The New York Times, December 7, 2008</ref>

Plot synopsis
Having recently been let go from his job chauffeuring a wealthy developer and his wife in Lahinch, Co. Clare, Sharky returns to Dublin to look after Richard. Tension between the brothers is evident from the start and exists mostly in Richard's constant sniping and excessive demands from his younger brother. A source of early conflict stems from Richard’s inviting Nicky Giblin—Sharky’s love rival—to join the men, along with Ivan, for a game of poker.

Nicky Giblin unexpectedly arrives with the mysterious Mr. Lockhart, a man of refined appearance. During a tête-à-tête, Lockhart reminds Sharky of their prior meeting which occurred twenty-five years to the day previously, when the pair were remanded together in the Bridewell Garda Barracks when Sharky had been arrested over the killing of a vagrant, Lawrence Joyce. During the period of their captivity Sharky had agreed to a game of cards in which he wagered his soul in a game of poker against Lockhart in a bid to gain his freedom. Sharky won the game and with it his freedom, but with the proviso that Lockhart would at some future date have an opportunity to play him once again.

The play culminates with the poker game played between the five men. Ostensibly a harmless game of cards, it is in fact a game for Sharky’s soul as Lockhart reveals himself, in a series of private disclosures to Sharky, to be a Mephistophelian entity. Sharky once again trumps his adversary when, at the climax, Ivan reveals his winning hand of four aces which he had earlier mistaken for four fours due to his myopia.

Style

Written broadly in a naturalistic style, The Seafarer'' also has magical realist qualities as evidenced by Lockhart’s insights into Sharky’s past and his monologues on the afterlife.

McPherson’s dialogue is predominantly written in a working-class Dublin idiom but adopts a more self-conscious lyricism typical of the Irish theatre tradition during the Lockhart monologues.

Production history
Original production
The play premiered in September 2006 at the Cottesloe auditorium of London's Royal National Theatre. It received a 2007 Olivier Award nomination for Best Play, and Jim Norton won an Olivier for Best Performance in a Supporting Role.

The cast was:

 Mr Lockhart: Ron Cook
 Ivan Curry: Conleth Hill
 James 'Sharky' Harkin: Karl Johnson
 Nicky Giblin: Michael McElhatton
 Richard Harkin: Jim Norton
 Director: Conor McPherson
 Designer: Rae Smith
 Lighting Designer: Neil Austin
 Sound Designer: Mathew Smethurst-Evans

Broadway
The Broadway production opened December 6, 2007 at the Booth Theatre and closed on March 30, 2008.

The Broadway cast was:
 Mr Lockhart: Ciarán Hinds
 Ivan Curry: Conleth Hill
 James 'Sharky' Harkin: David Morse
 Nicky Giblin: Sean Mahon
 Richard Harkin: Jim Norton
 Director: Conor McPherson
 Designer: Rae Smith
 Lighting Designer: Neil Austin
 Sound Designer: Mathew Smethurst-Evans

This production garnered multiple Tony Award nominations in 2008, for Best Play, two for Best Performance by a Featured Actor in a Play (Conleth Hill; Jim Norton), and Best Director of a Play (Conor McPherson. Jim Norton won the Tony for Featured Actor in a Play.

Ireland
The play was first performed in Ireland at the Abbey Theatre in Dublin in May 2008, directed by Jimmy Fay.

The Dublin cast was:

 Mr Lockhart: George Costigan
 Ivan Curry: Don Wycherley
 James 'Sharky' Harkin: Liam Carney
 Nicky Giblin: Phelim Drew
 Richard Harkin: Maelíosa Stafford

Subsequent productions
The West Coast premiere, directed by Jasson Minadakis, ran November 13 – December 7, 2008 at Marin Theatre Company in Mill Valley, California.

The cast was:

 Mr. Lockhart: Robert Sicular
 Ivan Curry: Andrew Hurteau
 James 'Sharky' Harkin: Andy Murray
 Nicky Giblin: John Flanagan
 Richard Harkin: Julian Lopez-Morillas

The New Jersey regional premiere, directed by Anders Cato, ran November 18, 2008 – December 14, 2008 at George Street Playhouse in New Brunswick, NJ.

The cast was:

Mr Lockhart: Robert Cuccioli
Ivan Curry: William Hill
James 'Sharky' Harkin: David Adkins
Nicky Giblin: Matthew Boston
Richard Harkin: David Schramm

Steppenwolf Theatre Company in Chicago, IL, staged the Chicago premiere December 4, 2008 – February 22, 2009, in the Steppenwolf Downstairs Theatre. It was directed by Randall Arney and featured ensemble members Francis Guinan, Tom Irwin, John Mahoney and Alan Wilder.

The cast was:
 Mr Lockhart: Tom Irwin
 Ivan Curry: Alan Wilder
 James 'Sharky' Harkin: Francis Guinan
 Nicky Giblin: Randall Newsome
 Richard Harkin: John Mahoney

The play opened in Budapest, Hungary December 19, 2008 at Bárka. It was directed by Göttinger Pál, in a translation by Upor László.

The cast was:
Mr Lockhart: Kálid Artúr
Ivan Curry: Gados Béla
James "Sharky" Harkin: Ilyés Róbert
Nicky Giblin: Dévai Balázs
Richard Harkin: Mucsi Zoltán

The play opened January 14, 2009 at The Studio Theatre in Washington, DC.

The Pacific Northwest premiere directed by Wilson Milam opens March 4, 2009 at Seattle Repertory Theatre in Seattle, WA with Scenic Designer Eugene Lee and cast:

Mr Lockhart: Frank Corrado
Ivan Curry: Russell Hodgkinson
James 'Sharky' Harkin: Hans Altwies
Nicky Giblin: Shawn Telford
Richard Harkin: Sean G. Griffin

The play opened April 4, 2012 at The Alley Theatre in Houston, Texas, directed by Gregory Boyd.

The cast was:

Mr Lockhart: Todd Waite
Ivan Curry: Declan Mooney
James 'Sharky' Harkin: James Black
Nicky Giblin: Chris Hutchison
Richard Harkin: John Tyson

The Scottish and Northern Irish premiere, directed by Rachel O'Riordan, opened February 8, 2013 at Perth Theatre in Perth, Scotland and transferred to the Lyric Theatre, Belfast on February 28, 2013. Designer: Gary McCann. Lighting: Kevin Treacy. Associate Director: Alasdair Hunter. It won Best Director (Rachel O'Riordan) and Best Ensemble at the Critics Awards for Theatre in Scotland.

The cast was:

Mr Lockhart: Benny Young
Ivan Curry: Sean O'Callaghan
James 'Sharky' Harkin: Louis Dempsey
Nicky Giblin: Tony Flynn
Richard Harkin: Ciaran McIntyre

References

2006 plays
Plays by Conor McPherson
Plays set in Dublin (city)
Christmas plays